Nelson station or Nelson Station may refer to:
in Canada
 Nelson Canadian Pacific railway station

in England
 Nelson railway station in Lancashire,
 Nelson Dock railway station, a former station on the Liverpool Overhead Railway

in the United States
 Nelson, California, formerly known as Nelson Station
 Nelson Dewey Generating Station, Cassville, Wisconsin

See also 
 List of Nelson railway stations, for any of the stations on the Nelson Section in Tasman district, New Zealand